The Turning Point is a 1952 American film noir crime film directed by William Dieterle and starring William Holden, Edmond O'Brien and Alexis Smith. It was inspired by the Kefauver Committee's hearings dealing with organized crime.

Plot
John Conroy is a Special Prosecutor, given extraordinary powers to break up the crime syndicate in a large midwestern town; his investigation will focus on Neil Eichelberger and his criminal operation.  A local journalist, Jerry McKibbon, is sympathetic to this but feels Conroy isn't experienced enough to handle the task.  Matt Conroy, John Conroy's father, is a local policeman and is assigned to be his chief investigator.

McKibbon discovers that Matt Conroy is a crooked cop who works for Eichelberger. McKibbon demands that Matt break with the mobster or he'll inform his son, John Conroy, of the duplicity.  To vindicate himself, it is decided that Matt Conroy will procure a damning file from the D.A.'s office that Eichelberger has requested, but he will retain a copy.

Even before this double-cross is exposed, Eichelberger decides to have Matt Conroy murdered in order to instill fear in his operation and show that Eichelberger is in control of the situation, since John Conroy's investigation is more serious than expected.  Matt Conroy is killed during a phony robbery, and his assassin, Monty LaRue, is immediately killed in turn.

John Conroy's investigation is systematically uncovering Eichelberger's crimes, and in anticipation of having their books subpoenaed, Eichelberger has the building housing them burned.  He has callous disregard for the people renting there, and all are killed.  An expose of Matt Conroy's murder reveals that Eichelberger had LaRue killed also.

His widow Carmelina LaRue can prove this, and contacts McKibbon in order to exact revenge, but is chased away by Eichelberger's henchmen.  Since McKibbon is the only one that can identify Carmelina LaRue, her husband's murderer, Roy Ackerman, demands that McKibbon be killed, but Eichelberger refuses.  Ackerman hires a hit man himself, and McKibbon is lured to a boxing match where he can be shot.

Meanwhile, Carmelina manages to reach John Conroy and her testimony is sufficient, along with already acquired information, to topple Eichelberger.  The hired gun shoots McKibbon, and as he lies dying, Eichelberger and his crew are arrested. McKibbon dies before John Conroy can arrive.

John Conroy's epitaph for McKibbon is something McKibbon himself has previously said: "Sometimes someone has to pay an exorbitant price to uphold the majesty of the law."

Cast
 William Holden as Jerry McKibbon 
 Edmond O'Brien as John Conroy 
 Alexis Smith as Amanda Waycross 
 Tom Tully as Matt Conroy 
 Ed Begley as Neil Eichelberger
 Danny Dayton as Roy Ackerman
 Adele Longmire as Carmelina LaRue
 Ray Teal as Clint, Police Captain
 Ted de Corsia as Eamon Harrigan
 Don Porter as Joe Silbray
 Howard Freeman as Fogel
 Neville Brand as Red
 Carolyn Jones (uncredited) as Miss Lilian Smith

Production
Several locations of historical interest in Downtown Los Angeles can be seen in this film. The original Angel's Flight funicular railway is part of one scene. The Hotel Belmont can also be seen. Other buildings that can be seen are the San Fernando Building in the Bank District and a Metropolitan Water District building at 3rd and Broadway.

Actress Carolyn Jones made her motion picture debut in the film.

Radio adaptation
The Turning Point was presented on Broadway Playhouse May 13, 1953. The 30-minute adaptation starred Dane Clark.

References

External links
 
 
 
 

1952 films
1952 crime drama films
1950s political drama films
American black-and-white films
American crime drama films
American political drama films
Film noir
Films about journalists
Films about organized crime in the United States
Films directed by William Dieterle
Paramount Pictures films
1950s English-language films
1950s American films